Diaphus regani, the Regan's lanternfish, is a species of lanternfish 
found in the Atlantic and Indian Oceans.

Size

Etymology
The fish is named in honor of ichthyologist Charles Tate Regan (1878–1943), Natural History Museum (London).

References

Myctophidae
Taxa named by Åge Vedel Tåning
Fish described in 1932